Soggy Flakes is a Canadian animated short comedy film, created by Heath, Jon, Nathan and Thomas Affolter and released in 2017. The film centres on a group of washed-up former breakfast cereal mascots, who are forced to reevaluate their definition of success when they unexpectedly encounter their sellout former friend and colleague Captain Kale. The voice cast includes Peter New, Cole Howard, April Cameron, David C. Jones, Stephanie Halber, Robert Heimbecker and Toren Atkinson.

The film was funded in part by a $10,000 prize from Telus's Storyhive contest for emerging filmmakers, and was inspired by a news report suggesting that Kellogg's was considering expanding into dog food due to declining sales of its breakfast cereal lines.

The film premiered at the Montreal Stop Motion Festival in 2017, and was later screened at the Vancouver Short Film Festival in 2018, but was distributed primarily through Storyhive's YouTube channel.

The film received three Canadian Screen Award nominations at the 6th Canadian Screen Awards, for Best Web Program or Series, Fiction, Best Direction in a Web Program or Series (the Affolters) and Best Actor in a Web Program or Series (New).

References

External links
 

2017 films
2010s animated short films
Canadian animated short films
2017 short films
2010s English-language films
2010s Canadian films